Candleshoe is a 1977 American children's adventure comedy film, directed by Norman Tokar in a screenplay by David Swift and Rosemary Anne Sisson, produced by Walt Disney Productions, and distributed by Buena Vista. Based on the Michael Innes novel Christmas at Candleshoe, the film stars Jodie Foster, David Niven, Helen Hayes (in her final film role), and Leo McKern.

Plot
Con-artist Harry Bundage (McKern) believes that the lost treasure of pirate captain Joshua St. Edmund is hidden at Candleshoe, the large 
country estate of Lady St. Edmund (Hayes).  Thanks to Harry's cousin Clara (Vivian Pickles), a corrupt former cleaning woman at Candleshoe, Harry has the captain's first clue. Harry recruits street-smart American foster child Casey Brown (Foster), employing her to pose as Lady St. Edmund's granddaughter, the Honourable Margaret, 4th Marchioness of Candleshoe, who disappeared ten years ago at age four. Casey is the right age to pass for the long-lost Margaret and possesses several identifying scars that young Margaret was known to have. Casey agrees to go along with the con and discover further clues in exchange for a cut of the profits.

Arriving at Candleshoe, Casey finds that Lady St. Edmund is living in genteel poverty, and that Candleshoe itself is constantly on the verge of being unable to pay its taxes. Priory (Niven), the estate's butler (who is forced to pose as various members of the household to conceal that all the other servants have been let go) manages to keep one step ahead of foreclosure by pawning the house's antiques, conducting tours of the estate, and selling produce at market. Four local orphans adopted by Lady St. Edmund assist Priory.

Casey eventually becomes part of the family and decides to find the treasure for the benefit of Candleshoe, rather than for Harry. This nearly costs the girl her life when she is seriously injured trying to prevent Harry from stealing money from Lady St. Edmund. Casey, now unconscious with a severe concussion, is taken to a hospital, and remains there for several days. Meanwhile, without the money Harry has stolen, Candleshoe is unable to pay its taxes and is within days of foreclosure. When Casey learns that Lady St. Edmund is preparing to go to a retirement home and send the children back to the orphanage, she breaks down and tells them about the treasure. After unraveling the final clue together, the household returns to Candleshoe to find Harry and his crew tearing the place apart to find the hidden treasure. Casey, Priory, and the children manage to fight off the thieves until the police arrive, inadvertently discovering the treasure in the process.

With Candleshoe safe and her scheme discovered, Casey, feeling she has no right to stay, prepares to return to Los Angeles, but is stopped by Lady St. Edmund, who offers her a real home at Candleshoe. Casey expresses doubt, wondering what will happen if Lady St. Edmund's real granddaughter ever returns, but she is eventually persuaded to return to Candleshoe with Lady St. Edmund. The ending is ambiguous as to whether Casey truly is the real Margaret.

The four clues revealed in the hunt for the treasure:
"For the sunrise student there is treasure among books." (This refers to a message in a stained-glass window that can only be seen in the Candleshoe library at sunrise.)
"The paths of glory lead but to the grave." (This refers to the poem "Elegy Written in a Country Churchyard" by Thomas Gray.)
"He followed the eclipse for riches and fame; and, if ye would prosper, do ye the same." (The clue refers to a painting of Captain St. Edmund's ship, the Eclipse.)
"Underfoot, in the great hall. Look high, look low, discover all." (This clue refers to a statue of Captain St. Edmund in Candleshoe's great hall. The statue's foot is propped on a chest in which the treasure is hidden.)

Location

Compton Wynyates in Warwickshire, then home to William Compton, 6th Marquess of Northampton, posed as the fictional estate of Candleshoe.

The Severn Valley Railway that runs between the midland towns of Bridgnorth and Kidderminister in the United Kingdom was used as a location in the film.

Cast
 Jodie Foster as Casey Brown
 David Niven as Priory
 Helen Hayes as Lady Gwendolyn St. Edmund
 Leo McKern as Harry Bundage
 Vivian Pickles as Clara Grimsworthy
 Veronica Quilligan as Cluny
 Ian Sharrock as Peter
 Sarah Tamakuni as Anna
 David Samuels as Bobby
 John Alderson as Jenkins
 Mildred Shay as Mrs. McCress, Casey’s Foster Mother
 Michael Balfour as Mr. McCress, Casey’s Foster Father
 Sydney Bromley as Mr. Thresher
 Michael Segal as Train Guard

Music
On September 15, 2015, Intrada Records released a special edition of the soundtrack containing the entire score from the film plus bonus material, including alternate takes of some tracks.

Reception
Metacritic gave the film a 68% score.

See also
Crooks and Coronets (1969)
Fitzwilly (1967)
Anastasia (1997)
Herbie Rides Again (1974)

References

External links
 

Candleshoe DVD Review

1977 films
1970s adventure comedy films
1970s children's comedy films
American adventure comedy films
American children's comedy films
American heist films
Films based on British novels
Films directed by Norman Tokar
Films produced by Ron W. Miller
Films scored by Ron Goodwin
Films shot in England
Films shot at Pinewood Studios
Walt Disney Pictures films
1977 comedy films
Rail transport films
1970s English-language films
1970s American films